Lundy is an island in the Bristol Channel of Great Britain.

Lundy may also refer to:

Places 
 Lundy, a sea area in the Shipping Forecast
 Lundy, California, United States; a town
 Lundy, Missouri, United States; an unincorporated community
 Lundy, Nova Scotia, Canada
 Lundy's Lane, Niagara Falls, Ontario, Canada; an urban highway
 100604 Lundy, the Asteroid Lundy

People 
 Lundy (surname)
 Lundy family of the 2000 Lundy murders; Christine Marie, Amber Grace, Mark Edward
 Hok Lundy (1950–2008) Cambodian police officer

Facilities and structures
 Ralph Lundy Field, Patriots Point Soccer Complex, Mount Pleasant, South Carolina, USA
 Benjamin Lundy House, Mount Pleasant, Ohio, USA
 Lundy's Restaurant, a seafood restaurant in Brooklyn, NY founded by the Lundy family

Biological
 Lundy cabbage
 Lundy cabbage flea beetle
 Lundy Pony

Other uses 
 , the Empire Ship "Lundy", WWII British ship
 Lundy 500, an event set up by the Salient magazine, to reenact the drive from the Lundy murders

See also

 Lundys Corners, Ontario, Canada
 Ranier-Lundy Racing, U.S. stock car racing team
 Lundy-Kotula, an aircraft brand
 
 
 Lundey (disambiguation), the name of three Icelandic islands
 Lindy (disambiguation)